Hearts of Darkness: A Filmmaker's Apocalypse is a 1991 American documentary film about the production of Apocalypse Now, the 1979 Vietnam War epic directed by Francis Ford Coppola.

Synopsis and production
Hearts of Darkness chronicles how production problems—among them bad weather, actors' poor health, and other issues—delayed the filming of Apocalypse Now, increasing costs and nearly destroying the life and career of its director, Francis Ford Coppola.

The documentary was begun by Coppola's wife, Eleanor Coppola, who narrated behind-the-scenes footage. In 1990, Coppola turned her material over to two young filmmakers, George Hickenlooper and Fax Bahr (co-creator of MADtv), who subsequently shot new interviews with the original cast and crew, and intercut them with Eleanor Coppola's material. After a year of editing, Hickenlooper, Bahr, and Coppola debuted their film at the 1991 Cannes Film Festival to universal critical acclaim. 

The title is derived from the Joseph Conrad 1899 novella Heart of Darkness, the source material for Apocalypse Now.

Awards
Originally aired on the Showtime Network in the United States, Hearts of Darkness won several awards, among them the National Board of Review award for Best Documentary, 1991; an American Cinema Editors society award for Best Edited Documentary (1992); two Academy of Television Arts & Sciences awards for "Outstanding Individual Achievement – Informational Programming – Directing" and "Outstanding Individual Achievement – Informational Programming – Picture Editing" (1992), and the International Documentary Association award (1992).  Critic Gene Siskel listed it as the best movie of 1991.

Home media
Hearts of Darkness was released by Paramount Home Video on VHS and LaserDisc in 1992, with further re-releases occurring in 1994 and 1998. Paramount later released the film on DVD on November 20, 2007. That version includes a commentary track from both Eleanor and Francis Ford Coppola, recorded separately, and a bonus documentary entitled Coda, about Coppola's film Youth Without Youth.

The film is also available on Blu-ray in the Full Disclosure (2010) and Final Cut (2019) editions of Apocalypse Now.

Cultural references
A quote from the Coppola interview shown at the beginning of the film ("We were in the jungle, there were too many of us, we had access to too much money, too much equipment, and little by little we went insane") is sampled in UNKLE's song "UNKLE (Main Title Theme)", and also in the Cabaret Voltaire song "Project80" (as part of a larger sample from that interview).

Hearts of Dartmouth: Life of a Trailer Park Girl is a documentary about the making of the TV series Trailer Park Boys. It was directed and narrated by Annemarie Cassidy, then-wife of Trailer Park Boys director Mike Clattenburg.

An episode of the cartoon Animaniacs, "Hearts of Twilight", was a parody of the documentary.

The TV comedy Community referenced the documentary in the episode "Documentary Filmmaking: Redux", Abed Nadir says "…ever see Hearts of Darkness? Way better than Apocalypse Now."

On the DVD commentary of Good Will Hunting, Matt Damon and Ben Affleck reveal that Casey Affleck's line "I swallowed a bug" is a reference to Marlon Brando's line in the documentary. In the Joss Whedon film Serenity, River Tam has the same line.

The 2008 comedy Tropic Thunder parodies both Hearts of Darkness and Apocalypse Now.

See also
Other documentaries about troubled movie productions:

 Burden of Dreams, about the making of the 1982 film Fitzcarraldo
 Empire of Dreams, about the complicated production of the 1977 film Star Wars
 Jodorowsky's Dune, about the troubled pre-production and unsuccessful adaptation of Frank Herbert's novel Dune
 Lost Soul, about the making of the 1996 version of The Island of Dr. Moreau
 Lost in La Mancha, about Terry Gilliam's unfinished first version of The Man Who Killed Don Quixote, a film adaptation of the novel Don Quixote by Miguel de Cervantes
 Claude Lanzmann: Spectres of the Shoah, about the 12-year making of Claude Lanzmann’s Shoah
 The Death of "Superman Lives": What Happened?, about the troubled pre-production and unsuccessful Tim Burton film that would have been written by Kevin Smith and starred Nicolas Cage as the Man of Steel
  Jim & Andy, about the making of the 1999 film Man on the Moon.
  The Sweatbox, about the making of the 2000 film The Emperor's New Groove.

References

External links
 
 
 

1991 films
American documentary films
American Zoetrope films
Apocalypse Now
Documentary films about films
Films directed by George Hickenlooper
Francis Ford Coppola
Films directed by Eleanor Coppola
Primetime Emmy Award-winning broadcasts
1990s English-language films
1990s American films